Normalization agreement may refer to:

Bahrain–Israel normalization agreement
Israel–Morocco normalization agreement
Israel–Sudan normalization agreement
Israel–United Arab Emirates normalization agreement

See also
Abraham Accords
Arab–Israeli normalization
Kosovo and Serbia economic normalization agreements (2020)